The 1981 New York Giants season was the franchise's 57th season in the National Football League. The Giants qualified for the playoffs for the first time in 18 years with a 9–7 record, which placed them third in the National Football Conference East Division.  The Giants qualified for the postseason thanks to an overtime victory over the Dallas Cowboys in the last game of the season, coupled with a loss by the Green Bay Packers.  In the Wild Card playoffs, the Giants defeated the Philadelphia Eagles 27–21 in Philadelphia's Veterans Stadium. New York's season ended with a 38–24 loss to the San Francisco 49ers in the Divisional round. The 49ers would go on to win Super Bowl XVI.

Offseason

NFL Draft
The Giants drafted linebacker Lawrence Taylor from the University of North Carolina at Chapel Hill. Taylor would be inducted into the Pro Football Hall of Fame in 1999.

Personnel

Staff

Roster

Schedule

Note: Intra-division opponents are in bold text.

Game summaries

Week 12

    
     
    
    
    
    

This was the Giants' first win over the Eagles since 1975.

Week 13

Week 14

Week 15

Week 16: vs. Dallas Cowboys

Heading into their last regular season game, the Giants needed a win over the Dallas Cowboys to remain in postseason contention. Dallas, the NFC East champions, required a victory against New York, along with a loss by the San Francisco 49ers, to clinch home-field advantage in the NFC playoffs. Neither team scored in the first half; Giants kicker Joe Danelo missed two field goal attempts from inside 30 yards in the first quarter. The Giants opened the scoring during their second possession of the second half, as Scott Brunner completed a 20-yard touchdown pass to Tom Mullady. On the final play of the third quarter, Dallas wide receiver Tony Hill caught a 44-yard pass from Danny White; three plays later, White threw a touchdown pass to Doug Cosbie, which allowed the Cowboys to tie the game, 7–7. On the Giants' next drive, Brunner threw an interception to Michael Downs; after taking possession in Giants territory, the Cowboys went in front on a 36-yard field goal by Rafael Septién.

Dallas held a three-point lead into the closing minutes of the fourth quarter, when a Tony Dorsett fumble gave the Giants the ball at the Cowboys' 45-yard-line. Inside the final minute, Danelo attempted a game-tying field goal from 40 yards. His kick was good, and the game was forced into overtime. The Giants had the first possession of overtime after winning the coin toss, but were forced to punt. On the Cowboys' second play of their first overtime drive, Dorsett was unable to field a pitch by White; Lawrence Taylor recovered the fumble and the Giants gained possession at the Dallas 40-yard-line. Danelo's ensuing 33-yard field goal attempt was unsuccessful, hitting an upright. The Giants then forced another Cowboys turnover, as White was intercepted by Byron Hunt, who returned the ball to the Dallas 24-yard-line. Danelo was called on again, and his 35-yard field goal clinched a 13–10 victory for the Giants. The following day, the New York Jets defeated the Green Bay Packers, giving the Giants their first playoff berth since 1963.

Playoffs

Standings

References

New York Giants seasons
New York Giants
New York Giants season
20th century in East Rutherford, New Jersey
Meadowlands Sports Complex